The American Melody Hour was an American old-time radio program. The American Melody Hour was designed as a musical variety show. The program showcased a half-hour playing and singing "the tunes of yesterday and tomorrow..." mostly sung by baritone Bob Hannon.

The program was hosted by lyric soprano Vivian Della Chiesa. Other regular performers on the program included conductor Frank Black, vocalist Frank Munn and baritone Conrad Thibault. The program was produced by daytime radio monarch Frank Hummert.

The American Melody Hour originally could be heard on the Blue Network on Wednesday nights from October 22, 1941–April 15, 1942. The program than moved to CBS Tuesdays at 7:30 pm on April 21, 1942. In 1947, the program moved to Wednesdays at 8 where it ended its run on July 7, 1948. The program was sponsored by Bayer aspirin its entire six-year run.

References

External links
Four episodes of The American Melody Hour available for download at Radio Echoes

NBC radio programs
CBS Radio programs